Kadapra is one of the developing Area in Thiruvalla Taluk, Pathanamthitta district in the state of Kerala, India. It lies near to Parumala and Niranam. Much development is occurring.It Is Part Of Thiruvalla Sub-District.It Also Comes Under Thiruvalla Constituency.

Demographics
 India census, Kadapra had a population of 25101 with 11922 males and 13179 females.

References

Villages in Pathanamthitta district
Cities and towns in Pathanamthitta district